Howard Hayes (born 1949) is a male former boxer who competed for England. He was a member of the Doncaster Boxing Club.

Boxing career
Hayes won the 1969 Amateur Boxing Association British lightweight title, when boxing out of the Plant Works ABC.

He represented England in the -60 kg lightweight division, at the 1970 British Commonwealth Games in Edinburgh, Scotland.

He turned professional on 3 November 1970 and fought in 21 fights until 1974.

References

English male boxers
1949 births
Boxers at the 1970 British Commonwealth Games
Living people
Lightweight boxers
Commonwealth Games competitors for England